Tamalinsky District is an administrative and municipal district (raion), one of the twenty-seven in Penza Oblast, Russia. It is located in the southwest of the oblast. Its administrative center is the urban locality (a work settlement) of Tamala. Population: 16,503 (2010 Census);  The population of Tamala accounts for 45.3% of the district's total population.

Notable residents 

Nikolai Krylov (1903–1972), Marshal of the Soviet Union
Aleksei Makushkin (born 1997 in Tamala), football player

References

Notes

Sources

External links
Video presentation of selo Zudrilovo and Zubrilovka, former estate of princes Prozorovskiy-Golitzyns

Districts of Penza Oblast